Florida Union Free School District is a school district in the village of Florida, in Orange County in the U.S. state of New York.
The superintendent of schools is Jan Jehring.

Board of education
The elected board of education consists of the following people:
Daniel A. Codi, President
Karyn Meier, Vice President 
Robert W. Katulak 
John T. Redman II
Deborah Slesinski

Schools
The district operates 
a high school, the S.S. Seward Institute, 
an elementary school, Golden Hill Elementary School, and 
a Special Programs unit.

Legal issues
The district was a party in the court case dealing called Walczak v. Florida Union Free School District dealing with free appropriate public education in which a court ruled that children are not entitled to the best education that money can buy; they are only entitled to an appropriate education.

References

External links

School districts in New York (state)
Education in Orange County, New York